Anita Graham (born 15 February 1948) is a British film, stage and television actress and a former member of the Royal Shakespeare Company.

Graham's first television role was in an episode of Crossroads (1964). She went on to appear in The New Avengers (1976), The Benny Hill Show (1977), Within These Walls (1978), in four episodes of Terry and June (1979–80) as Tina Pillbeam, Tom, Dick and Harriet (1982), Let There Be Love (1983), The Morecambe & Wise Show (1983), six episodes of Keep It in the Family (1982-3), Full House (1985), Dempsey and Makepeace (1986), as Bollit in the Delta and the Bannermen episodes of Doctor Who (1987), Zelda in four episodes of Moon and Son (1992), EastEnders (1996), Last of the Summer Wine (2001), and Horne & Corden (2009).

Film appearances include Don't Just Lie There, Say Something! (1974), Confessions of a Window Cleaner (1974), and Who Is Killing the Great Chefs of Europe? (1978).

For the Royal Shakespeare Company she appeared in Piaf and Once in a Lifetime, both in 1980 at the Piccadilly Theatre. In 1983 she appeared in Look, No Hans at the Yvonne Arnaud Theatre, and The Mating Game at the Theatre Royal in Windsor. She appeared again in Look, No Hans at the Strand Theatre (1985-6), and in Run For Your Wife (1987) at the Criterion Theatre, acting again in the latter play at the Duchess Theatre from 1990-91.

In 1990 she acted in Kathy Burke's play Mr Thomas at the Old Red Lion Theatre.  It was subsequently filmed and shown on Channel 4. Graham acted in Funny Money at the Playhouse Theatre (1996), and in The Norman Conquests for Ian Dickens (2007). In 2012 she appeared in Michael Cooney's Cash on Delivery at The Mill at Sonning.

References

External links

Graham on the 'Who's Who Of The Benny Hill Show' website

1948 births
Living people
British television actresses
British film actresses
British stage actresses
Royal Shakespeare Company members